Che Che may refer to:

Chéché, a village on the Corubal River in Guinea-Bissau
Che Che Lazaro Presents, a now defunct program of Philippines TV network GMA 
Cheche Lazaro, Filipina TV host
 Che Rosli Che Mat,  Malaysian politician and Member of the Parliament of Malaysia for the Hulu Langat constituency.
Che Uda Che Nik, Malaysian politician and Member of the Parliament of Malaysia for the Sik constituency in Kedah.